Rubinstein–Taybi syndrome (RTS) is a rare genetic condition characterized by short stature, moderate to severe learning difficulties, distinctive facial features, and broad thumbs and first toes. Other features of the disorder vary among affected individuals. These characteristics are caused by a mutation or deletion in the CREBBP and/or EP300 gene located on chromosome 16.

People with this condition have an increased risk of developing noncancerous and cancerous tumors, leukemia, and lymphoma. This condition is sometimes inherited as an autosomal dominant pattern and is uncommon. Many times it occurs as a de novo (not inherited) occurrence. It occurs in an estimated 1 in 125,000-300,000 births.

Presentation

Rubinstein–Taybi syndrome presents itself from birth, and is usually hallmarked by delayed physical and cognitive growth.

Typical features of the disorder include:
 Broad thumbs and broad first toes and clinodactyly of the 5th finger
 Mental disability
 Small height, low bone growth, small head
 Cryptorchidism in males
 Unusual facies involving the eyes, nose, and palate
 Anesthesia may be dangerous in these patients: "According to the medical literature, in some cases, individuals with Rubinstein–Taybi syndrome may have complications (e.g., respiratory distress and/or irregular heart beats [cardiac arrythmias]) associated with a certain muscle relaxant (succinylcholine) and certain anesthesia. Any situations requiring the administration of anesthesia or succinylcholine (e.g., surgical procedures) should be closely monitored by skilled professionals (Anesthesiologists)." Primary literature suggests the children may have a higher rate of cardiac physical and conduction abnormalities which may cause unexpected results with cardioactive medications. A further editorial reply in the British Journal of Anaesthesia discusses changes in the face and airway structure making it more difficult to secure the airway under anaesthesia, however, complications appeared in a minority of cases, and routine methods of airway control in the operating room appears to be successful. They recommended close individual evaluation of Rubinstein–Taybi patients for anaesthetic plans.

A 2009 study found that children with RTS were more likely to be overweight and to have a short attention span, motor stereotypies, and poor coordination. The study hypothesized that the identified CREBBP gene impaired motor skills learning. Other research has shown a link with long-term memory (LTM) deficit.

It is diagnosed when a heterozygous pathogenic variant of the CREBBP gene is identified in the individual. It exhibits an autosomal dominant inheritance pattern, but some documented cases show heterozygous individuals exhibiting germline mosaicism. This condition affects men and women equally, and is often misdiagnosed with other diseases or disabilities that result in delayed mental development.

Genetics

Rubinstein–Taybi syndrome is a microdeletion syndrome involving chromosomal segment 16p13.3 and is characterized by mutations in the CREBBP gene. Varying amounts of material are deleted from this section of the chromosome and accounts for the spectrum of physiological symptoms.

The CREBBP gene makes a protein that helps control the activity of many other genes. The protein, called CREB-binding protein, plays an important role in regulating cell growth and division and is essential for normal fetal development. If one copy of the CREBBP gene is deleted or mutated, cells make only half of the normal amount of CREB binding protein. A reduction in the amount of this protein disrupts normal development before and after birth, leading to the signs and symptoms of Rubinstein–Taybi syndrome.

Mutations in the EP300 gene are responsible for a small percentage of cases of Rubinstein–Taybi syndrome. These mutations result in the loss of one copy of the gene in each cell, which reduces the amount of p300 protein by half. Some mutations lead to the production of a very short, nonfunctional version of the p300 protein, while others prevent one copy of the gene from making any protein at all. Although researchers do not know how a reduction in the amount of p300 protein leads to the specific features of Rubinstein–Taybi syndrome, it is clear that the loss of one copy of the EP300 gene disrupts normal development.

A mouse model has been identified in order to perform experimental research procedures. The model has exhibited the same clinical symptoms seen in humans and has become a foundation for future research.

Unfortunately, in nearly 40% of cases, neither gene, CREBBP or EP300, can be implicated in the cause of the disease. In these cases, there is no mutation on the 16th chromosome leaving many more questions yet to be answered. However, new research shows that around 55% of cases involve a mutation in the CBP gene, further suggesting that this disease has its origins in mutation of the regulatory mechanisms of transcription (Izumi, 2016).

Treatment 
There is no existing treatment that reverses or cures RTS. There are, however, ways to manage and reduce symptoms for patients. Patients with RTS suffer from a diverse breadth of symptoms. These include cognitive-developmental impairment, heart abnormalities, delayed bone growth and skeletal abnormalities, auditory impairment, urinary tract abnormalities, including kidney problems, and dental and speech problems. Not every patient will suffer from all or multiple symptoms, and not every patient will experience the same symptoms, meaning they differ from patient to patient. Due to there being a wide range of symptoms, RTS patients are referred to specialists that focus on each specific symptom. There is not a specialist for RTS. For example, patients will go to an orthopedic surgeon and physical therapy for skeletal and growth abnormalities, like scoliosis but will go to a cardiologist if they suffer from heart abnormalities or a dentist if they suffer from dental abnormalities. Individuals suffering from cognitive developments usually are part of special education programs and speech therapy. The specialists the individuals go to match the symptoms the individuals have. Regular check-ups and monitoring are needed for cardiac, dental, auditory, and renal abnormalities. Genetic counseling is also recommended for affected individuals and their families.

History 
Rubinstein–Taybi syndrome was first unofficially mentioned in a French orthopedic medical journal in 1957 by Greek physicians' doctors: Michail, Matsoukas, and Theodorou. The medical journal reported a case concerning a seven-year-old boy with radically deviated/arched thumbs, long nose, muscular hypotonia, along with physical and mental underdevelopment. At this point in time the case study mentioned by the Greek physicians was considered to be an anomaly due to the fact that there hadn't been any other reported cases of children with these specific physical and mental characteristics. The doctors accredited with discovering the syndrome and therefore bear its name-sake were unaware of this journal at the time of their discovery. However, it is acknowledged that the 1957 case reported in the French journal of orthopedic medicine is most likely the first reported case of RTS.

Dr. Jack Herbert Rubinstein, an American pediatrician reported assessing a three-year-old girl with unusual facial and digital findings in 1958. Similarly, that same year Rubinstein had evaluated another child with similar characteristics, this time a seven-year-old boy. Having sensed a striking similarity between these two unrelated cases Rubinstein tried distributing photos and information concerning these two cases to other clinics in the U.S. from 1959 to 1960. Rubinstein graduated from Harvard Medical School and worked as the director of the Hamilton County Diagnostic Clinic for the Mentally Retarded. He has worked in behavioral and developmental pediatrics for many years prior to the discovery of this new syndrome.

In 1961, Dr. Hooshang Taybi, an Iranian-American pediatric radiologist, reported having assessed a three-year-old boy that appeared to have the same syndrome as described by Rubinstein. During the summer of 1963 Dr. Taybi reported having evaluated seven children with characteristics such as broad thumbs and great toes, "unusual" facial features, and intellectual disabilities – these findings went on to appear in the American Journal of Diseases of Children documenting these characteristics as a syndrome. Dr. Hooshang Taybi graduated from Tehran University School of Medicine and worked for the Ministry of Health. Later in his career he taught and practiced pediatric radiology in Oklahoma and Indiana. He had identified three new syndromes with his colleagues, among them is Rubinstein–Taybi syndrome.

In 1992 the first genetic abnormalities that act as markers for Rubinstein-Taybi syndrome were identified. These abnormalities are said to affect either chromosome 16 or chromosome 22. The specific chromosome impacted by a mutation determines the type of Rubinstein–Taybi syndrome that may occur. A mutation of the CREBP gene on chromosome 16 gives rise to the first form of RTS (most common). While a mutation of the EP300 gene on chromosome 22 is characteristic of the second form of RTS.

See also 
 Nasodigitoacoustic syndrome
 List of cutaneous conditions

References

External links 

 GeneReview/UW/NIH entry on Rubinstein-Taybi syndrome
 Rubinstein-Taybi syndrome due to 16p13.3 microdeletion on ORPHAnet

Transcription factor deficiencies
Conditions of the skin appendages
Congenital disorders
Autosomal dominant disorders
Syndromes with craniofacial abnormalities
Syndromes with short stature
Syndromes with dysmelia